Arkansas is a compilation of album tracks from Hey Little One and A New Place in the Sun plus the B-sides of Capitol singles "Private John Q"/"Less of me" (1965), "By the Time I Get to Phoenix"/"You've Still Got a Place in My Heart" (1967) and "Where's the Playground Susie?"/"Arkansas" (1969).

Track listing
Side 1:

 "Arkansas" (M. Torok, R. Redd) - 2:36
 "That's All That Matters" (Hank Cochran) - 2:29
 "She Called Me Baby" (Harlan Howard) -3:00
 "Less of Me" (Glen Campbell) - 2:35
 "Sunny Day Girl" (J. Hildt, R. Williams) - 2:11

Side 2:

 "A Place In The Sun" (B. Wells, R. Miller) - 2:42
 "Just Another Man" (Glen Campbell, J. Allison) - 2:16
 "It's Over" (Roy Orbison, Bill Dees) - 2:38
 "You've Still Got a Place in My Heart" (Leon Payne) - 2:28
 "Freeborn Man" (Keith Allison, Mark Lindsay) - 2:40

1975 compilation albums
Glen Campbell compilation albums
Capitol Records compilation albums